Craig O'Brien (born 3 March 1970) is a former Australian rules footballer who is most notable for his stint with the Essendon Football Club, St Kilda Football Club and finishing his career at the Sydney Swans in the Australian Football League.

O'Brien was a dangerous small forward (Height: 174 cm; Playing Weight: 89 kg) from Rye in Victoria.  His style can be compared to current Swan Ryan O'Keefe, and he was a tough uncompromising in and under player.

In 1991, he was traded by Essendon to St Kilda. At the end of 1995, he was traded to the Swans. After several years at the Swans, O'Brien retired in 2000.

Coaching career
After his AFL career, O'Brien turned to coaching, where he took up a position with the Broadbeach Australian Football Club in Queensland. O'Brien also coached the St George F.C in Sydney in 2001.

O'Brien recently returned to Broadbeach in 2020 and coached them to the Premiership in 2021

References

External links

Australian rules footballers from Victoria (Australia)
Sydney Swans players
Essendon Football Club players
St Kilda Football Club players
Living people
1970 births